The PZL M-17 "Duduś Kudłacz" (initially EM-5A) was a Polish twin-boom pusher general aviation and trainer aircraft of 1977, which remained a prototype.

Design and development
The aircraft was an amateur design of a team of students of Warsaw University of Technology (Politechnika Warszawska) led by Edward Margański. It had an unorthodox layout of a pusher with twin booms and very streamlined fuselage. A crew of two sat side by side, and had double controls. A tricycle landing gear was retractable.

The plane was designed in 1969-1971. At the design stage it was designated EM-5A (EM for Margański) and nicknamed Duduś Kudłacz (Hairy Duduś). The aircraft factory PZL-Mielec in Mielec got interested in the design and took over its development, under a designation PZL M-17. The design was modified there with help of Margański, plastic and duralumin construction was changed to riveted duralumin, and a less powerful engine.

The only prototype was flown on 7 July 1977 by S. Wasil. It was not produced in series. In 1979 the prototype was given to Rzeszów University of Technology. A shortcoming of a streamlined fuselage was a cramped cockpit, the crewmen were half-laying in a similar way, as in gliders.

The plane was a mid-wing monoplane. It had a two-blade wooden propeller and a 310 liter fuel tank .

Specifications

See also

References

PZL M-17 at Poser site

External links

Photos

1970s Polish civil utility aircraft
M17
Warsaw University of Technology